Khutso Steven Kgatle, better known by his stage name King Monada, is a South African singer, songwriter, and record producer. He rose to fame after the release of his 2016 single "Ska Bhora Moreki" and "Malwedhe" (2018), which peaked #9 iTunes Chart and #54 Apple Music Chart. He is known for singing in the Khelobedu language, which are local dialects of Northern Sotho.

Life and career
Khutso Steven Kgatle was born on 25 November 1992 in Tzaneen in Limpopo. Monada has two brothers and two other siblings. He attended school at Sebone Primary School and Magoza High School where he dropped out in Grade 8 to pursue his career in music. On 9 November 2018, Malwedhe was released and voted #2 on Ukhozi FM Song Of The Year.

Personal life
He is married to Lerato Ramawela and Cynthia Nthebatse Leon.

Discography
 Molamo (2016)
 Noka Yao Goma (2020)

Achievements

References 

South African musicians
Living people
1992 births